Kutchins is a surname. Notable people with the surname include: 

Ben Kutchins, American cinematographer
Laurie Kutchins, American poet

See also
Hutchins (surname)